The 2006 Hat Yai bombings took place in Hat Yai, Songkhla Province, Thailand on 16 September 2006 and are believed to be part of the ongoing South Thailand insurgency. At least four people were killed and 82 were injured.  The attacks were similar to the 2005 Songkhla bombings.

The attacks 
The attack consisted of six bombs which were detonated at around 9:30 pm in the Ocean Department Store, in front of the Brown Sugar Pub, a car parking building, a Big C shopping mall, the Lee Gardens Hotel and Diana Department Store. The bombs were planted on motorcycles and were triggered by mobile phone. The attacks have marred a day which was supposed to have been dominated by a military peace rally held in the south.

Casualties 

Among those killed were a Malaysian, a Canadian and two Thais.

Suspects 
It is assumed that the South Thailand insurgency carried out the attacks. While no terrorist organisation took responsibility for the bombings, General Thammarak Isarangkura na Ayudhaya indicated that Thai authorities had expected bomb attacks in Hat Yai sometime between 16 and 20 September to mark the first anniversary of the Gerakan Mujahidin Islam Patani (GMIP) separatist movement, which is a splinter group of the Gerakan Mujahidin Patani (GMP).

See also 
 2005 Songkhla bombings
 South Thailand insurgency

References 

South Thailand insurgency
Terrorist incidents in Thailand in 2006
Songkhla province
Improvised explosive device bombings in Thailand
Islamic terrorism in Thailand
Religiously motivated violence in Thailand
Attacks in Asia in 2006
Mass murder in 2006
2006 crimes in Thailand